Matthew Betley is a former Marine, and an American writer of thriller novels.

Biography

Early life and education
Matthew Betley was born in New Jersey. He is a graduate of St. Xavier High School in Cincinnati, Ohio (1990), a Jesuit college preparatory school, and Miami University in Oxford, Ohio (1994). Betley received his B.A. in psychology and studied political science and sociology as minors. He interned for the Public Defender's office in Washington DC, investigating felony murder cases, in his first semester.

Early career
Upon graduation he joined the Marine Corps instead of attending law school. He trained as a ground intelligence and infantry officer, and once commanded a scout sniper platoon. He deployed to Africa after 9/11 and then Iraq in 2006. Betley left the Marines in 2009.  He is also a recovering alcoholic 8+ years sober and speaks openly about his experiences with addiction.

Writing and media career
Matt reportedly got so bored with a best-seller he was reading that he decided to write a book that could be much better.

Bibliography

Logan West Series
Betley wrote the Logan West series about Logan is a US Marine Corps veteran who achieved the rank of captain. He was posted in Iraq, where he lost some of his men in an ambush. He is recovering alcoholic, who used alcohol to ease his nightmares.

References

External links
Official Matthew Betley website
Interview on “Great Day Washington” on WUSA CBS Channel 9
Radio interview with Annapolis’ 1430 WNAV’s Bill Lusby

Year of birth missing (living people)
Living people
American male novelists
United States Marine Corps personnel of the Iraq War
American thriller writers
Writers from Cincinnati
21st-century American novelists
Miami University alumni
21st-century American male writers
Novelists from Ohio
St. Xavier High School (Ohio) alumni
United States Marine Corps officers